Sir Gerald Hayden Phillips  (born 9 February 1943) is a retired English civl servant.

Early life
He was educated at Cambridgeshire High School for Boys, Clare College, Cambridge, and Yale University.

Career
He joined the Civil Service as an Assistant Principal in the Home Office in 1967, and was Economic Adviser, 1970–72, Principal 1972–74, and Assistant Secretary, and Principal Private Secretary to the Home Secretary (Roy Jenkins), 1974–76. From 1977 to 1979 he served as Deputy Chef de Cabinet to Roy Jenkins as President of the European Commission. He returned to the Home Office as Assistant Secretary from 1979 to 1981, and then as Assistant Under-Secretary of State from 1981 to 1986.

From 1986 to 1988 he was Deputy Secretary in the Cabinet Office (Management and Personnel Office, subsequently Office of the Minister for the Civil Service). From 1988 to 1992 he was Deputy Secretary in HM Treasury.

From 1992 to 1998 he was Permanent Secretary, Department for National Heritage (Department for Culture, Media and Sport from 1997). From 1998 to 2004 he was Clerk of the Crown in Chancery and Permanent Secretary of the Lord Chancellor's Department (Department for Constitutional Affairs from 2003).

Phillips was appointed a Companion of the Order of the Bath (CB) in 1989, promoted to a Knight Commander of the same Order (KCB) in 1998, and again promoted to a Knight Grand Cross of that Order (GCB) in 2002.

Post-civil service activity
After retiring, he undertook a review of the honours system in 2004. From 2006–7 he undertook a review of the funding of political parties, and in 2007 chaired inter-party talks on political funding.

From 2004 to 2010 he was Chairman of the National Theatre.

Since 2006 he has been Chairman of the Council of Marlborough College, having been a Council member since 1997.

Since 1 January 2010 he has been Independent Reviewer for the Advertising Standards Authority.

He played the part of Colonel Dent in the 2011 film of Jane Eyre and the part of Sir Sebastian D'ath in the 2022 James Bond film No Time to Die. 

He was appointed a Deputy Lieutenant for the county of Wiltshire in 2017.

References

External links

Living people
1943 births
Alumni of Clare College, Cambridge
Yale University alumni
Knights Grand Cross of the Order of the Bath
Deputy Lieutenants of Wiltshire
Permanent Secretaries to the Lord Chancellor's Office
Private secretaries in the British Civil Service
English civil servants